Reşat Ekrem Koçu (1905 – July 6, 1975) was a Turkish writer and historian. His best known work is his unfinished Istanbul Encyclopedia (İstanbul Ansiklopedisi), which recounts many tales of Istanbul from Ottoman times. Koçu and his colorful depictions of Ottoman Istanbul are celebrated in Orhan Pamuk's book Istanbul: Memories and the City.

Life
Koçu was born in Istanbul. After completing his high-school education at Bursa Erkek Lisesi in the north-western town of Bursa, Koçu studied history at Istanbul University, where he later worked as a researcher of the Ottoman period. From 1933, in the wake of Atatürk's secularist reform of the Turkish university system, Koçu taught history in the high schools of Alman, Kuleli, Pertevniyal and Vefa in Istanbul. During his teaching years, Koçu also published poems, stories and novels.

Works
Koçu's best known work is his Istanbul Encyclopedia (İstanbul Ansiklopedisi), which evokes many different aspects of the ancient city, including many stories from Ottoman times. The first volume of this unfinished work was brought out by Koçu in 1958. In 1973, financial difficulties forced Koçu to interrupt composition at the eleventh volume, while still working on the letter B. The text is accompanied by fanciful line illustrations.

Koçu's other works include Forsa Halil (1962), Patrona Halil (1967), Erkek Kızlar (1962), Haşmetli Yosmalar (1962), Türk Giyim, Kuşam ve Süsleme Sözlüğü (1967), Osmanlı Padişahları (1960) and Eski İstanbul'da Meyhaneler ve Meyhane Köçekleri (1947).

Legacy
The novelist Orhan Pamuk describes Koçu as a major source of inspiration during his childhood years. An entire section of Pamuk's largely autobiographical work Istanbul: Memories and the City is devoted to Koçu.

Bibliography 
 Forsa Halil
 Kabakçı Mustafa
 Dağ Padişahları
 Erkek Kızlar
 Patrona Halil
 Esircibaşı
 Kösem Sultan
 Fatih Sultan Mehmet
 Osmanlı Padişahları
 Eski İstanbul'da Meyhaneler ve Meyhane köçekleri
 Aşk Yolunda İstanbul'da Neler Olmuş
 Kızlarağasının Piçi
 Tarihte İstanbul Esnafı
 Tarihimizde Garip Vakalar
 Cevahirli Hanımsultan
 Osmanlı Tarihinin Panoraması
 Hatice Sultan ve Ressam Melling
 Yeniçeriler
 Topkapı Sarayı
 İstanbul Ansiklopedisi

References

External links
 Brief biography of Koçu (in Turkish)

20th-century Turkish historians
Turkish encyclopedists
Writers from Istanbul
Istanbul University alumni
1975 deaths
1905 births
Turkish LGBT writers
20th-century Turkish LGBT people